Terrance Smith (born February 9, 1987) is an American football defensive back / wide receiver who is currently a free agent. He played college football at South Carolina State. Smith was signed by the Jacksonville Sharks as an undrafted free agent in 2010.

Professional career
After going undrafted in the 2010 NFL Draft, Smith signed with the Jacksonville Sharks on September 27, 2010.

On December 1, 2010, Smith was signed to the Green Bay Packers' practice squad. He was placed on practice squad/injured on December 21, 2010.

Smith was assigned to the Los Angeles Kiss on November 20, 2015. On March 19, 2016, he was placed on reassignment. Smith was again assigned to the Kiss on June 3, 2016.

Smith was assigned to the Washington Valor on  March 1, 2017.

On June 27, 2018, Smith was assigned to the Albany Empire. On April 16, 2019, Smith was again assigned to the Empire.

References

External links
 Jacksonville Sharks bio
 Green Bay Packers bio

1987 births
Living people
Sportspeople from Aiken, South Carolina
Players of American football from South Carolina
American football wide receivers
American football defensive backs
South Carolina State Bulldogs football players
Jacksonville Sharks players
Los Angeles Kiss players
Shenzhen Naja players
Green Bay Packers players
Washington Valor players
Albany Empire (AFL) players
American expatriate players of American football
American expatriate sportspeople in China